The snubnose snake eel (Ophichthus brevirostris) is an eel in the family Ophichthidae (worm/snake eels). It was described by John E. McCosker and Steve W. Ross in 2007. It is a marine, subtropical eel which is known from North Carolina, USA, in the western central Atlantic Ocean.

The species epithet "brevirostris" means "short muzzle" in Latin, and is treated as a noun in apposition.

References

Ophichthus
Taxa named by John E. McCosker
Fish described in 2007